Julio César Gámez Interiano (born 8 December 1955) is a Honduran politician. He currently serves as deputy of the National Congress of Honduras representing the National Party of Honduras for Copán.

References

1955 births
Living people
People from Copán Department
Deputies of the National Congress of Honduras
National Party of Honduras politicians
Place of birth missing (living people)